Pūrva Bhādrapadā (lit. "the early blessed one", "highly intuitive") is the twenty-fifth of the 25 Nakshatra (constellations) in Hindu astrology, corresponding to α and β Pegasi.
It is placed under the domain of Bṛhaspati, the deity represented by the planet Jupiter. 
Practitioners of electional astrology see Pūrva Bhādrapadā as a Cruel sign, meaning that activities related to deception, craftiness or wickedness are best begin while this sign is in prominence.

Like its twin, Uttara Bhādrapadā, Pūrva Bhādrapadā is often represented by dualistic imagery, such as a two-headed man, or two legs of a bed. Crossed swords can also be used to symbolize this nakshatra. Its patron deity is the serpent Ajaikapada. The animal associated with this nakshatra is a male lion.

The Ascendant/Lagna in Pūrva Bhādrapadā indicates a person who is passionate and transformational, but a little extreme and indulgent. They are idealists and non-conformists and are good influencers of others and speakers and orators, but they can also be fearful, nervous, cynical and eccentric. 

It is thought that people born under this nakshatra make others obsessed over them and wanted to be like them.    

It is believed that the person with this star rising on ascendant has remarkable personality. It is the birth star of famous personalities like Martin Luther King, Shri Ramakrishna Paramhamsa, and Michael Jackson. 

People born under this nakshatra are given names that start with Se, So, Da, or Di.

References

Nakshatra